Colonel Robert Walpole (18 November 1650 – 18 November 1700) of Houghton Hall in Norfolk, was an English Whig politician and Colonel in the militia who served as a Member of Parliament for the borough of Castle Rising, Norfolk, from 1689 to 1700. He is mainly notable for being the father of Robert Walpole, 1st Earl of Orford, considered to have been the first Prime Minister of Great Britain. He is the ancestor of all the Barons Walpole and Earls of Orford, of all creations, and of the present Marquess of Cholmondeley, owner of Houghton Hall. He is also known as the Guinness World Records holder for having the world's longest overdue public library book.

Origins

He was born at Houghton Hall in 1650, the son and heir of Edward Walpole (d.1668) of Houghton (the family seat for over four decades), by his wife Susan Crane. His father ardently supported the Restoration of the Monarchy to King Charles II and was subsequently created a Knight of the Bath.

Political career 
In January 1689 he was elected as a Member of Parliament for Castle Rising in Norfolk and was considered the most influential Whig in Norfolk and one of the most influential whigs in Parliament. He served as a Deputy Lieutenant for Norfolk when Henry Howard, 7th Duke of Norfolk was Lord Lieutenant of Norfolk.

Marriage & issue

In 1671 he married Mary Burwell, daughter and heiress of Sir Geoffrey Burwell of Rougham  in Suffolk, by whom he had nineteen children, of whom only nine survived, two being stillborn and eight dying in infancy:

Sons
 Edward Walpole (1674 – ?)
 Burwell Walpole (1675 – ?)
 Robert Walpole, 1st Earl of Orford (1676–1745), eldest surviving son and heir, who shortly after his father's death became a Member of Parliament and later held the offices of Secretary at War, Treasurer of the Navy, Paymaster of the Forces, First Lord of the Treasury, Chancellor of the Exchequer, Leader of the House of Commons, and became the first Prime Minister of Great Britain. He remained a Member of Parliament for forty years.
 John Walpole (1677 – ?)

 Horatio Walpole, 1st Baron Walpole (1678-1757), one of the earliest holders of that first name in England, later much used by his family and by his illustrious cousin Admiral Horatio Nelson (1758-1805), his father's great-great grandson, born one year after 1st Baron Walpole's death. Horatio was a character in Shakespeare's 1599/1601 play Hamlet. He was a Member of Parliament for fifty-four years from 1702 until his death in 1757. During his political career he served as Secretary to the Treasury, Chief Secretary for Ireland, British Ambassador to France, Cofferer of the Household, Ambassador to the United Provinces and Teller of the Exchequer.
 Christopher Walpole, died as an infant
 Galfridus Walpole (1683–1726)
 Mordaunt Walpole (1688 – 1689)
 A stillborn boy (1690)
 Charles Walpole (1691 – ?)
 William Walpole (1693 – ?)

Daughters

 Susan Walpole (1672 – ?), wife of Anthony Hamond (d.1743);
 Mary Walpole (1673–1701), who married Sir Charles Turner, 1st Baronet of Warham, Norfolk, a lawyer and Whig politician, and was the great-grandmother of the great Admiral Horatio Nelson (1758-1805);
 Elizabeth Walpole, died in infancy;
 Elizabeth Walpole (1682–1736)
 Anne Walpole (1685 – ?)
 Dorothy Walpole (1686 – 29 March 1728), who in about 1713 married Charles Townshend, 2nd Viscount Townshend (1674-1738), who in his childhood had been her father's ward, son and heir of Horatio Townshend, 1st Viscount Townshend (1630-1687), a grandson of Horatio de Vere, 1st Baron Vere of Tilbury (1565-1635), an English military leader (one of the earliest English holders of that first name);
 Susan Walpole (1687 – ?)
 A stillborn girl

Overdue library book
In 1668 Walpole borrowed a German biography book about the Archbishop of Bremen from the library of Sidney Sussex College. It was finally found in 1956 when his descendant the 5th Marquess of Cholmondeley together with 
Professor John Plumb discovered the book in the library at Houghton. The book was quickly returned, 288 years after it was checked out.

Notes

References
 Burke, Bernard. A genealogical history of the dormant, abeyant, forfeited, and extinct peerages of the British empire. Harrison, 1866.
 Cherry, George L. The Convention Parliament, 1689: a biographical study of its members. Bookman Associates, 1966.
 Chisholm, Hugh. Encyclopædia Britannica Volume 28 of The Encyclopædia Britannica: A Dictionary of Arts, Sciences, Literature and General Information. Encyclopædia Britannica, 1911.
 Coxe, William. Memoirs of the Life and Administration of Sir Robert Walpole, Earl of Oxford: Containing the Memoirs. Kessinger Publishing, 2006.
 Coxe, William. Memoirs of the life and administration of Sir Robert Walpole: earl of Orford, Volume 4. Longman, Hurst, Rees, Orme, & Brown, 1816.
 Englefield, Dermont J. T. Facts about the British prime ministers: a compilation of biographical and historical information. H.W. Wilson Co., 1995.
 Ewald, Alexander Charles. Sir Robert Walpole: a political biography, 1676–1745. Chapman & Hall, 1878
 Folkard, Claire. Guinness World Records 2003. Bantam Books, 2003.
 Hillen, Henry J. History of the borough of King's Lynn, Volume 2. EP Publishing, 1978.
 
 Pearce, Edward. The Great Man. Sir Robert Walpole: Scoundrel, genius and Britain's First Prime Minister. Pimlico, 2008.
 Plumb, John H. Sir Robert Walpole: the making of a statesman, Volume 1. Cresset Press, 1956
 Shorter, Alyward. The Shorter family: England, America, and Africa in the history of a family. Heritage Books, 2003.
 Timbs, John. School-days of eminent men: I. Sketches of the progress of education in England, from the reign of King Alfred to that of Queen Victoria. II. Early lives of celebrated British authors, philosophers and poets, inventors and discoverers, divines, heroes, statesmen and legislators. Follet, Foster and Co., 1860.

1650 births
1700 deaths
People from Castle Rising
Robert Walpole
Robert
English MPs 1689–1690
English MPs 1690–1695
English MPs 1695–1698
English MPs 1698–1700
Parents of prime ministers of the United Kingdom
People from Houghton, Norfolk